Korean Indian may refer to:
Koreans in India
Indians in Korea

See also
India–North Korea relations
India–South Korea relations